Nivenia is a genus of flowering plants in the family Iridaceae first described as a genus in 1808. Species in the genus are restricted in distribution to an area in the Cape Province of South Africa.

The genus name is a tribute to the Scottish botanist James Niven (1774-1826), one of the first to collect the genus.

 Species
 Nivenia argentea Goldblatt 
 Nivenia binata Klatt
 Nivenia concinna N.E.Br - Viljoens Pass
 Nivenia corymbosa  (Ker Gawl.) Baker
 Nivenia dispar N.E.Br - Olifantskloof
 Nivenia fruticosa (L.f.) Baker - Langeberg Mountains
 Nivenia inaequalis Goldblatt & J.C.Manning
 Nivenia levynsiae Weim.
 Nivenia parviflora Goldblatt
 Nivenia stenosiphon Goldblatt 
 Nivenia stokoei (L.Guthrie) N.E.Br. - Caledon

References

Iridaceae genera
Iridaceae
Endemic flora of South Africa